= Salim Awan railway station =

Railway station in Pakistan

General information
- Coordinates: 33.4049°N 73.21843°E
- Owner: Ministry of Railways

Other information
- Station code: SLAW

History
- Former names: Great Indian Peninsula Railway
Location

Salim Awan railway station (Urdu: سلیم اعوان ریلوے اسٹیشن) is an abandoned railway station located in Pakistan.

== See also ==
- List of railway stations in Pakistan
- Pakistan Railways
